Winnie-the-Pooh and a Busy Day (or Winnie the Pooh and a Day of Troubles in the English dub title) is a 1972 animated film by Soyuzmultfilm, directed by Fyodor Khitruk and Gennady Sokolsky. Based on the book series by A. A. Milne, it is the final part of a trilogy, following Winnie-the-Pooh (1969) and Winnie-the-Pooh Pays a Visit (1971). Twice longer than either of its predecessors, this installment is co-written by Khitruk and Boris Zakhoder, with prototype drawings created by Khitruk and Vladimir Zuikov.

Storyline
Eeyore and Owl make their first appearance in the trilogy, while Winnie-the-Pooh, Piglet, and the narrator all return. (Rabbit appears only in the second installment.)  Once they learn it's Eeyore's birthday, his friends attempt to mark the occasion.

Cast
 Vladimir Osenev as the narrator.
 Yevgeny Leonov as Winnie-the-Pooh. 
 Iya Savvina as Piglet. 
 Erast Garin as Eeyore. Garin was the only actor invited at early stages of writing the trilogy – all others were recruited at the recording stage. 
 Zinaida Naryshkina as Owl. Although Naryshkina was an experienced actress, Khitruk knew nothing about her before the auditions; he immediately liked her acting and started recording her right at the auditions.

Legacy and awards
In 1976 Khitruk was awarded the USSR State Prize for the Winnie-the-Pooh trilogy. The animation characters, as designed by Khitruk's team, are featured on the 1988 Soviet and 2012 Russian postal stamps; they are permanently painted on a public streetcar running through the Sokolniki Park, and their sculptures are installed in Ramenki District in Moscow.

When Khitruk visited the Disney Studios, Wolfgang Reitherman, the author of Winnie the Pooh and the Blustery Day that won the 1968 Academy Award for Best Animated Short Film, told him that he liked the Soviet version better than his own.

References

External links

 
 Winnie the Pooh and a Busy Day at Animator.ru

1972 films
1972 animated films
Soyuzmultfilm
Soviet animated films
1970s Russian-language films
Russian animated short films
Films directed by Fyodor Khitruk
Winnie-the-Pooh featurettes
Animated featurettes